The Sethians were one of the main currents of Gnosticism during the 2nd and 3rd century CE, along with Valentinianism and Basilideanism. According to John D. Turner, it originated in the 2nd century CE as a fusion of two distinct Hellenistic Judaic philosophies and was influenced by Christianity and Middle Platonism. However, the exact origin of Sethianism is not properly understood.

History

Mentions
The Sethians (Latin Sethoitae) are first mentioned, alongside the Ophites, in the 2nd century, by Irenaeus (who was antagonistic towards gnosticism) and in Pseudo-Tertullian (Ch. 30). According to Frederik Wisse, all subsequent accounts appear to be largely dependent on Irenaeus. Hippolytus repeats information from Irenaeus.

According to Epiphanius of Salamis (c. 375), Sethians were in his time found only in Egypt and Palestine, but fifty years earlier, they had been found as far away as Greater Armenia.

Philaster's (4th century CE) Catalogue of Heresies places the Ophites, Cainites, and Sethians as pre-Christian Jewish sects. However, since Sethians identified Seth with Christ (Second Logos of the Great Seth), Philaster's belief that the Sethians had pre-Christian origins, other than in syncretic absorption of Jewish and Greek pre-Christian sources, has not found acceptance in later scholarship.

Origins and development
Hans-Martin Schenke was one of the first scholars to categorize several texts in the Nag Hammadi library as Sethian.

According to John D. Turner, British and French scholarship tends to see Sethianism as "a form of heterodox Christian speculation," while German and American scholarship views it as "a distinctly inner-Jewish, albeit syncretistic and heterodox, phenomenon." Roelof van den Broek notes that "Sethianism" may never have been a separate religious movement but that the term rather refers to a set of mythological themes that occur in various texts. According to Turner, Sethianism was influenced by Christianity and Middle Platonism, and six phases can be discerned in the interaction of Sethianism with Christianity and Platonism.

Phase 1. According to Turner, two different groups, existing before the 2nd century CE, formed the basis for the Sethians: a Jewish group of possibly priestly lineage, the so-called Barbeloites, named after Barbelo, the first emanation of the Highest God, and a group of Biblical exegetes, the Sethites, the "seed of Seth."

Phase 2. The Barbeloites were a baptizing group that in the mid-2nd century fused with Christian baptizing groups. They started to view the pre-existing Christ as the "self-generated (Autogenes) Son of Barbelo," who was "anointed with the Invisible Spirit's "Christhood"." According to Turner, this "same anointing [was] received by the Barbeloites in their baptismal rite by which they were assimilated to the archetypal Son of Man." The earthly Jesus was regarded as the guise of Barbelo, appearing as the Divine Logos, and receiving Christhood when he was baptized.

Phase 3. In the later 2nd century CE, the Christianized Barbeloites fused with the Sethites, together forming the Gnostic Sethianists. Seth and Christ were identified as bearers of "the true image of God who had recently appeared in the world as the Logos to rescue Jesus from the cross."

Phase 4. At the end of the 2nd century, Sethianism grew apart from the developing Christian orthodoxy, which rejected the Docetian view of the Sethians on Christ.

Phase 5. In the early 3rd century, Sethianism was fully rejected by Christian heresiologists, and Sethianism shifted toward the contemplative practices of Platonism, while losing their interest in their own origins.

Phase 6. In the late 3rd century, Sethianism was attacked by neo-Platonists like Plotinus, and Sethianism alienated from Platonism. In the early to mid-4th century, Sethianism fragmented into various sectarian Gnostic groups, like the Archontics, Audians, Borborites, and Phibionites. Some of these groups existed into the Middle Ages.

Relationship with Mandaeism
Various scholars have noted many similarities between Mandaeism and Sethianism. Kurt Rudolph (1975) has observed many parallels between Mandaean texts and Sethian Gnostic texts from the Nag Hammadi library. Birger A. Pearson also compares the "Five Seals" of Sethianism, which he believes is a reference to quintuple ritual immersion in water, to Mandaean masbuta. According to Buckley (2010), "Sethian Gnostic literature ... is related, perhaps as a younger sibling, to Mandaean baptism ideology."

Mythology
Sethianism attributed its gnosis to  Seth, third son of Eve and Adam, and Norea, wife of Noah, who also plays a role in Mandeanism and Manicheanism. The Sethian cosmogonic myth gives a prologue to Genesis and the rest of the Pentateuch, presenting a radical reinterpretation of the orthodox Jewish conception of creation, and the divine's relation to reality. The Sethian cosmogony is most famously contained in the Apocryphon of John, which describes an Unknown God, the same as Paul had done in the Acts of the Apostles 17:23. Many of the Sethian concepts derived from a fusion of Platonic or Neoplatonic concepts with the Old Testament, as was common in Hellenistic Judaism, exemplified by Philo (20 BC–40 AD).

Creation
From the "Unknown God" emanate aeons, a series of paired female and male beings. The first of these is Barbelo, who is coactor in the emanations that follow. The aeons that result are representative of the various attributes of God, which are indiscernible when they are not abstracted from their origin. God and the aeons comprise the sum total of the spiritual universe, known as the Pleroma.

In some versions of the myth, the Aeon Sophia imitates God's actions, performing an emanation of her own, without the prior approval of the other aeons in the Pleroma. This results in a crisis within the Pleroma, leading to the appearance of the Yaldabaoth, a "serpent with a lion's head." This figure is commonly known as the demiurge, the "artisan" or "craftsman," after the figure in Plato's Timaeus. This being is at first hidden by Sophia but subsequently escapes, stealing a portion of divine power from her in the process.

Using this stolen power, Yaldabaoth creates a material world in imitation of the divine Pleroma. To complete this task, he spawns a group of entities known collectively as Archons, "petty rulers" and craftsmen of the physical world. Like him, they are commonly depicted as theriomorphic, having the heads of animals. Some texts explicitly identify the Archons with the fallen angels described in the Enoch tradition in Judaic apocrypha.

At this point the events of the Sethian narrative begin to cohere with the events of Genesis, with the demiurge and his archontic cohorts fulfilling the role of the creator. As in Genesis, the  demiurge declares himself to be the only god, and that none exist superior to him. However, the audience's knowledge of what has gone before casts this statement, and the nature of the creator itself, in a radically different light.

The demiurge creates Adam, during the process unwittingly transferring the portion of power stolen from Sophia into the first physical human body. He then creates Eve from Adam's rib, in an attempt to isolate and regain the power he has lost. By way of this he attempts to rape Eve who now contains Sophia's divine power; several texts depict him as failing when Sophia's spirit transplants itself into the Tree of Knowledge. Thereafter, the pair are "tempted" by the serpent, and eat of the forbidden fruit, thereby once more regaining the power that the demiurge had stolen.

Theological significance
The addition of the prologue radically alters the significance of events in Eden. Rather than emphasizing a fall of human weakness in breaking God's command, Sethians (and their inheritors) emphasize a crisis of the Divine Fullness as it encounters the ignorance of matter, as depicted in stories about Sophia. Eve and Adam's removal from the Archon's paradise is seen as a step towards freedom from the Archons. Therefore, the snake in the Garden of Eden becomes a heroic, salvific figure rather than an adversary of humanity or a 'proto-Satan'. Eating the fruit of Knowledge is the first act of human salvation from cruel, oppressive powers.

Sethian texts
Most surviving Sethian texts are preserved only in Coptic translation of the Greek original. 
Very little direct evidence of Gnostic teaching was available prior to the discovery of the 
Nag Hammadi library, a collection of 4th-century Coptic translations of Gnostic texts which were apparently hidden 
in reaction to Athanasius of Alexandria's  Easter letter of 367 which banned the use of non-canonical books.
Some of these texts are known to have been in existence in the 2nd century, but it is impossible to exclude the presence  of later syncretic material in their 4th-century translations.

 The Gospel of Judas (Codex Tchacos, c. 300; mentioned by Irenaeus, c. 180)
 Nag Hammadi library:
 The Apocalypse of Adam 
 The Apocryphon of John (mentioned by Irenaeus, c. 180)
 The Thought of Norea
 The Trimorphic Protennoia (Codex XIII)
 The Holy Book of the Great Invisible Spirit (also known as the Coptic Gospel of the Egyptians)
 Zostrianos
 Three Steles of Seth
 Marsanes
 Melchizedek
 Allogenes
 The Thought of Norea
 The Second Treatise of the Great Seth
 The Reality of the Rulers, also known as The Hypostasis of the Archons
 The Thunder, Perfect Mind
 The Untitled Text (or Untitled Apocalypse or The Gnosis of the Light) (Bruce Codex, c. 5th century)
 The Coptic Apocalypse of Paul

The Gospel of Judas is the most recently discovered Gnostic text. National Geographic has published an English translation of it, bringing it into mainstream awareness. It portrays Judas Iscariot as the "thirteenth spirit (daemon)", who "exceeded" the evil sacrifices the disciples offered to Saklas by sacrificing the "man who clothed me (Jesus)". Its reference to Barbelo and inclusion of material similar to the Apocryphon of John and other such texts, connects the text to Barbeloite and/or Sethian Gnosticism.

See also
 Neoplatonism and Gnosticism
 John D. Turner
 Knights of Seth (19th-century "Neo-Sethian" group)
 List of Gnostic sects
 Second Treatise of the Great Seth (Nag Hammadi text which in spite of its title does not actually make reference to Seth)
 Five Seals
 Valentinianism

Notes

References

Sources

External links
 John D Turner: translations of the Sethian Nag Hammadi text and history

 
Early Gnostic sects
Gnosticism
Jewish religious movements